Royal Phelps (1809 – 1884) was a businessperson from the United States and Venezuela. He was a member of the New York State Assembly (New York Co., 14th D.) in 1862.

References 
 New York Times
 Smokerhistory.com

American business executives
Venezuelan businesspeople
1884 deaths
1809 births
Members of the New York State Assembly
19th-century American politicians
19th-century American businesspeople